The Taritatu or  Idenburg River also called Baliem River is a river in the northern part of the Indonesian province of Papua.

Name
During the Dutch colonial era it was known as the Idenburg River.

Hydrology 
The Taritatu River flows generally westward in the basin north of the island's central mountainous cordillera. The Sobger River is the major tributary. Eventually it meets the Tariku River, and at this confluence the two rivers become the Mamberamo River, one of the largest rivers on the island of New Guinea (Papua). The total length is 266.176 km.

Geography
The river flows in the northern area of Papua with predominantly tropical rainforest climate (designated as Af in the Köppen-Geiger climate classification). The annual average temperature in the area is 22 °C. The warmest month is October, when the average temperature is around 23 °C, and the coldest is March, at 21 °C. The average annual rainfall is 4269 mm. The wettest month is April, with an average of 487 mm rainfall, and the driest is July, with 278 mm rainfall.

See also
List of rivers of Indonesia
List of rivers of Western New Guinea

References

Rivers of Papua (province)
Rivers of Indonesia